Iwikau Te Heuheu Tūkino III (? – October 1862) was a notable New Zealand tribal leader. Of Māori descent, he identified with the Ngāti Tūwharetoa iwi.

References

Year of birth unknown
1862 deaths
Ngāti Tūwharetoa people
Te Heuheu family